Christopher John Bant (21 February 1881 – 22 November 1949) was an Australian rules footballer who played with St Kilda and Geelong in the Victorian Football League (VFL).

Notes

External links 

1881 births
1949 deaths
Australian rules footballers from Victoria (Australia)
St Kilda Football Club players
Geelong Football Club players
Ballarat Imperial Football Club players